Antiquitas Lost: The Last of the Shamalans is the debut novel of American author Robert Louis Smith. It is a fantasy novel that chronicles the adventures of an American teenage boy after he stumbles through a magical doorway in his grandfather's basement, and into a war-torn fantasy world called Pangrelor. The main story arc involves the protagonist's gradual discovery of his unknown relation to Pangrelor, and his unlikely quest to help save its greatest civilization, which is centered on the mountaintop city of Harwelden. Several times during the story, the protagonist is told that success in saving this fabled city of Harwelden may help to save his own dying mother, who remains isolated from him and terminally ill in New Orleans.

Antiquitas Lost has many high quality illustrations, which is unusual for this genre.

Synopsis
Antiquitas Lost tells the story of a boy named Elliott, a lonesome kid with deformities on his hands and feet, who is uprooted from his home after his mother falls gravely ill. When they move to New Orleans so his grandfather can help care for her, Elliott learns that the old man's eighteenth century mansion hides an ancient secret. While checking out some eerie paintings and strange relics in the basement, Elliott strays through an ancient doorway into a tumultuous parallel world, full of bizarre creatures and warring races. He has stumbled into Pangrelor, the most ancient of all worlds and “mother to all the stars in the sky.” As he learns to navigate his new surroundings, he discovers wondrous abilities he never dreamed he possessed, and an abiding connection to the primitive, alien world that will forever change him. But he must proceed carefully. For he soon learns that his actions in the ancient world will impact the upcoming battle for Harwelden, Pangrelor's greatest civilization, and will also resonate all the way back to New Orleans, perhaps deciding whether his own mother lives or dies.

Artwork

Antiquitas Lost had more than 70 high quality illustrations, which were drawn and inked by Marvel Comics artist Geof Isherwood, who now spends most of his time working in the film industry. Prior to working on Antiquitas Lost, Isherwoods's credits include longtime illustrations of Marvel Comics including Spider-Man, The X-Men, The Silver Surfer, Conan the Barbarian, Daredevil, Doctor Strange, Namor, The Avengers, and others. Credits in the film industry include concept/production illustrations for Richard Donner (Director of The Omen, Superman, & Lethal Weapon), Bryan Singer (Director of The Usual Suspects, X-Men, X2), and Darren Aronofsky (Director of The Fountain, The Wrestler), among others. In 1997, Isherwood also introduced his own comic book title, Lincoln-16, which garnered praise for its artwork from Marvel Comics icon Stan Lee.

Editing
Antiquitas Lost was edited by freelance editor Michael Carr, whose editing credits include: Michael Moorcock's White Wolf’s Son, Brad Meltzer's The Zero Game (NY Times No. 3 bestseller), Patricia Smiley's Cover Your Eyes (LA Times bestseller), Bernard Goldberg's Arrogance (NY Times bestseller), Al Sharpton's Al on America, CNN's Lou Dobbs’ Exporting America, and Tucker Carlson's Politicians, Partisans, and Parasites. Carr has edited for several major publishing houses, including Time Warner Books, Penguin Putnam, Holcomb Hathaway, and Globo Libros. In January 2011, after completing his work on the manuscript for Antiquitas Lost, Carr edited and translated into English the book, Buried Alive: The True Story of the Chilean Mining Disaster and the Extraordinary Rescue at Camp Hope, by Chilean miner Manuel Pino Toro.

Critical reception and reviews

Critical response to Antiquitas Lost was favorable, and positive reviews of the novel were published by Kirkus Reviews, Foreword Reviews, Library Journal, and The Seattle Post-Intelligencer. Kirkus Reviews stated: “This is a bildungsroman and quest tale in the tradition of epic high fantasy, and fans of the genre will enjoy the extensive world building and imaginative magical feats. The characters are well-developed, some with poignant back stories and others whose true intentions aren’t revealed until the very end. Though the novel is lengthy, there is never a dull moment, as the characters’ actions drive the plot at a steady pace all the way to the ultimate battle. More than 70 pen-and-ink illustrations by Geof Isherwood, evocative of a Dungeons and Dragons Monster Manual, add an extra dimension to Smith's vivid descriptions. Pleasing for readers looking to escape into an expansive world of magic, conflict and racing action.” In January 2012, KirkusReviews.com briefly featured Antiquitas Lost on its home page, touting it as a 2011 Critics Pick. Foreword Reviews also praised Antiquitas Lost, stating: “This debut novel is a far-flung quest through a world of nightmarish creatures and epic conflicts in the spirit of Tolkien's The Hobbit, but what makes the story truly wondrous are the many personal touches that the author provides in creating his multi-faceted characters."  The Seattle Post Intelligencer review stated: “Robert Louis Smith has channeled Anne Rice's unassuming writing style and pacing while borrowing themes from an earlier period of fantasy writing... Antiquitas Lost is a nostalgic trip to another world. It borrows much from an earlier period of books, comics, and movies and comes off as an original homage to everything loved about youth with enough that is new to avoid parody.”  ComicAttack.net criticized the novel for using familiar fantasy plot mechanisms, and suggested simplistic thematic depth, yet offered an overall positive review, stating: "[Antiquitas Lost has] a fresh, easy feel with lots of clear, well versed action. Smith’s greatest asset is his ability to write with great pacing. For a 615 page epic fantasy, this has an enjoyable pace that’s not too fast and not too slow... [It] brought out the childhood me who enjoyed reading old novels with illustrations such as Treasure Island." ScienceFiction.com also reviewed Antiquitas Lost favorably, stating: "...The creatures that Smith created resemble popular creatures from other novels, with the exception of the Salax. The Salax are horrifying and unique...[Antiquitas Lost] was compelling and energetic. You can tell Isherwood enjoyed illustrating it as well, with his detail and his character depictions."  However, the ScienceFiction.com review criticized the protagonist as being too one dimensional, and described some of the early character development as "tedious". Goodreads.com lists a cumulative rating for Antiquitas Lost of 3.78 out of 5 stars, and Amazon customer reviews offers 4.5 out of 5 stars.

Awards
On October 17, 2011, HollywoodSoapbox.com selected Antiquitas Lost as the "most promising novel" featured at the 2011 New York ComicCon, which featured thousands of exhibitors and hosted over 100,000 fans. In January 2012, KirkusReviews.com briefly featured Antiquitas Lost on its home page as a 2011 Critics Pick. In  June 2012, Antiquitas Lost was awarded bronze in Best Juvenile Fiction category at the 16th Annual Independent Publisher Book Awards in New York City.  In August 2012, Antiquitas Lost was featured on the cover of Publishers Weekly, and in March 2013, Antiquitas Lost won a Pinnacle Award for Best Juvenile Fiction.

Major characters
Listed are the major characters in the book. 
Elliott: age 15, lonesome and unlucky boy from New Orleans with deformities on his hands and feet. At the beginning of the story, he stumbles through a magical doorway into an ancient, parallel world (Pangrelor), where he discovers that his deformities hide strange abilities he never dreamed he possessed. As he learns to navigate his new surroundings, he also discovers an abiding connection to the alien world into which he has passed. Elliott is the story's protagonist.
Sarintha: age 16–18, Princess of Harwelden (Pangrelor's greatest civilization). Just before the story begins, Sarintha suffers the death of her father, King Gregorus. At the beginning of the story, she is captured by the enemy serpan horde and carried away to their homeland. As the story progresses, she begins to fear that she is the intended target of a coup, and that the forces at Harwelden do not intend for her to be crowned as Queen.
 Hooks: middle-aged beast from the Valley of Susquatania. Hooks is a petty criminal and an outcast from his homeland. Early in the story, he is captured during the commission of a theft and sentenced to die in Harwelden's central square. But he has a few tricks up his sleeve, and an incredible secret no one could ever guess.
 Marvus: elderly gimlet with some fight left in him, and chief steward of the captured Princess.
 Jingo: the youngest gimlet ever advanced to the position of royal steward. He is Marvus's protege and also serves Princess Sarintha. He is skilled with throwing a dagger and widely known for his faith in The Shama, a local religion.
 Crosslyn: an elderly, though powerful, Shamalan priest. He was a member of the royal Shamalan court in the old times, and was thought to be long dead. Elliott and others find him hiding in the wilderness, waiting for the winds of war to turn back in favor of Harwelden.
 Woolf: a middle-aged grayfarer, and sitting member of Harwelden's Grayfarer Council. He is a fierce and loyal warrior, who is sent on a quest to hunt down Elliott lest he interfere with the empires plans for war with the serpans.
 Slipher: a young serpan warrior who defects from his regiment. Facing certain death if captured by his own countrymen, he aims to redeem himself by assassinating Elliott, who has piqued the interest of the serpan emperor.
Malus Lothar: the mysterious Serpan emperor, whose face remains covered at all times by an ornate steel mask. He is a believer in the old magic, and fears that Elliott's unexpected arrival in Pangrelor may adversely affect his plans to storm Harwelden and eradicate the Shamalans once and for all.
 Grimaldi: an older grayfarer, and general in Harwelden's grayfarer army. Like Woolf, he is a fearsome warrior, though he has been captured by the serpans before the story begins. When Princess Sarintha is imprisoned by the serpans, she finds her old friend Grimaldi faces a grisly fate.
Waldemariam: a middle-aged grayfarer warrior, and Chancellor of Harwelden's powerful Grayfarer Council. As the story progresses, his loyalties become unclear, though he holds so much power, no one is quite sure what to do about it.

Races

Listed are the major types of creatures in the book. 
Shamalans: For thousands of years, Shamalans have been the ruling class on Pangrelor. They are Atlantean in concept and have the ability to transform themselves into an aquatic form. Once in the aquatic form, they can breathe underwater and swim “like creatures born of the sea”. Underwater, specialized membranes cover their eyes and allow them to see clearly. However, when they are in their “land form”, they are indistinguishable from humans, except for “birthmarks” that cover the webbed spaces between their hands and feet. There are four distinct classes of Shamalans. These include the nobles, the priests, the warriors, and the artisans. Major Shamalan characters in Antiquitas Lost include Princess Sarintha (noble) and Crosslyn (priest).
Grayfarers: Grayfarers are a class of winged warriors that are approximately eight feet tall and canine in appearance. They are known for their predilection for battle and for their lack of faith in The Shama (a local religion). They have talons on their hands and feet and their primary means of locomotion is flight, though they have no trouble walking. They have been allied with the Shamalans for perhaps a thousand years and serve as the protectors of Harwelden (Pangrelor's ruling civilization). The powerful Grayfarer Council of Harwelden is a political body second in power only to the royalty. Major Grayfarer characters in Antiquitas Lost (there are many) include Waldemariam, Woolf, Grimaldi, and Oscar.
 Serpans: The Serpans are a race of massive, primitive hominids that live on Pangrelor's icy northern continent (Vengala). Serpan culture is remorselessly violent. Like the Shamalans, the Serpans are an ancient race, but their geographic origins have left them at a strong disadvantage for natural resources. Conversely, The Shamalans inhabit the lush southeastern coast of Pangrelor's bountiful Carafayan continent, and this disparity of natural resources has been a driving force in the generations-long war between the Shamalan empire and the Serpan hordes. Major Serpan characters in Antiquitas Lost include Slipher and Golthel.
 Gimlets: Gimlets are a race of diminutive, primitive hominids with keen intelligence. They are known for their short stature, potbellies, and protuberant ears. Gimlet cities have thrived throughout all of Pangrelor, and gimlets seem to be ubiquitous there. Over the last few generations, the Carafayan gimlets (those living on the same continent as the Shamalans) have had to adapt to the realities of war as attacks from the northerly serpan horde have increased in frequency and lethality. As a result, several gimlet cities have formed their own armies. For the friendly gimlet race, such a thing would have been unheard of just a few generations previously. Major gimlet characters in Antiquitas Lost include Marvus and Jingo.
 Susquatanians: Susquatanians are a race of furry, bipedal, forest-dwelling beasts that occupy the wooded Valley of Susquatania (aka the “Valley of the Beasts”) and the neighboring Susquatanian Forest. Their ancient wooded homeland lies between the mountain city of Harwelden, where the Shamalans live, and the Serpans spindly mountaintop castle (known as Sitticus). Because of their geographic location, the Susquatanians increasingly find themselves caught in the middle of the escalating war between the Shamalans and the Serpans. However, they are determined to remain neutral at all costs, and spare themselves from the agonies of the worsening conflict. Major Susquatanian characters in Antiquitas Lost include Hooks and Keats.
 Darfoyles: Darfoyles share remote biological origins with the Grayfarers, and the two races are described as “ancient cousins”, though the darfoyles are larger, darker in color, and have tails. Like the Grayfarers, the Darfoyles have talons on their hands and feet and flight is their primary method of locomotion. The Darfoyles tend to inhabit Pangrelor's northern climes and they are closely allied with the serpans (much like the Grayfarers to the Shamalans). There appear to be fewer Darfoyles in Pangrelor than Grayfarers, though some of the Darfoyles serving the serpan emperor have become quite well known. Major Darfoyle characters in Antiquitas Lost include Viscount Ecsar and Viscount Erebus.

Pangrelor

Pangrelor, the fantasy world depicted in Antiquitas Lost, is envisioned as a habitable mega-planet, or "Super-Earth" orbiting a binary star system. The size of the world is referred to obliquely (ten times larger than earth), and the planet is frequently described as having two suns. Gravitational forces are not explained, though the characters seem to experience gravity and temperatures similar to those of Earth.

Flora and Fauna: Flora and fauna seem quite similar to Earth's Pleistocene era. For example, two species of giant, wingless birds (Magby's and Opilions) are mentioned in the books early chapters. These are similar to the Moa, large wingless birds that were common in the Pleistocene and persisted until about 1400 AD, when they are believed to have gone extinct. There are also references to tiny elephants, sloths (called larilars in the novel) wooly mammoths, giant beavers, dire wolves, cave bears, and great sabre-toothed cats (simitars), all of which were common in the Pleistocene.  There is at least one Pangrelorian species of dinosaur referenced in the book (malevosaurs). In addition to these creatures, several recognizable cryptozoological creatures inhabit Pangrelor as well, including the Susquatanian beasts (similar to our own Sasquatch) and the Grayfarers (similar to Gargoyles). There are at least two types of creatures in Pangrelor, the Salax and the Satyral, that seem to have no connection to any types of creatures we are familiar with on Earth, though the Satyral is a chimera, making him reminiscent of creatures seen in ancient Greek mythology. Most of the action in the story takes place on the continent of Lon Carafay (aka the Carafayan continent). Three large Carafayan forests are described (with giant trees that have trunks "wider than a fair sized house").
Technology: Pangrelor is a pre-industrial medieval world, with technology having reached anywhere from stone-age capabilities to iron-age capabilities, depending on which Pangrelorian culture is depicted. There is no electricity and communications must travel by word-of-mouth, though magic is possible. Transportation across long distances is primarily achieved by riding horses, malevosaurs, or mammoths (unless one is a Grayfarer or Darfoyle, in which case flight is possible). The story's antagonist, Malus Lothar, often travels by "sky chariot", which is a contraption that consists of a riders coach hanging beneath the hawsers of four, soaring, fire breathing lizards.
Culture: In regard to Pangrelor's cultural development, the artistic works that fill the mountaintop city of Harwelden are described as masterful, and likened by the protagonist to creations from Earth's European Renaissance period, such as the works of Michelangelo or Da Vinci. There are several references to majestic paintings, statues, murals and tapestries in Harwelden, as well as some in the gimlet city of Scopulus. In one scene, a ceremony is accompanied by a fine orchestra and choir. These advanced cultural developments stand in sharp contrast to the savage, untamed natural environment.
Transport:The protagonist, Elliott, is magically transported to Pangrelor after discovering an ancient doorway in the basement of his grandfather's eighteenth century New Orleans mansion. Toward the end of the story, it is implied that Pangrelor is a real place, existing somewhere among the stars. There seems to be an implication that the magical doorway through which Elliott was transported might be some type of wormhole. In the final scenes, Pangrelor is referred to as "the mother to all the stars in the sky", and "the first world". It is also stated that events on Pangrelor will have far reaching consequences that will affect happenings on other worlds, such as Earth.
Unique Qualities: The fantasy world of Pangrelor is different from many literary fantasy worlds, such as Tolkien's middle earth and the many derivative worlds that have followed, in that it is devoid of elves, dwarves, magic rings, and magic swords. Rather, the author has peopled Pangrelor with magical creatures that most readers will be familiar with, but ones quite different from the usual fantasy novel inhabitants.

Themes
There are a few dominant themes in the Antiquitas Lost

Clash of Cultures: Through the character Slipher, the novel explores what drives one culture (the serpans) to hate another (the shamalans). This topic is explored primarily through interactions between Slipher and Elliott, the books protagonist, as well as through Slipher's personal experiences and inner dialogue. Questions considered involve the role of poverty, squalor, and envy in motivating one to hate another. What is the culpability of the wealthier civilization?
Religion and faith as a political tool: The novels antagonist, Malus Lothar, consciously uses the serpans religious faith to motivate them to kill their enemies (the shamalans). Despite this, it is not clear that he himself shares this religious zeal. It is also implied that the Shamalan leaders are adept at using religious faith to motivate their own armies, though this is not depicted outright in the plot.
Redemption: Through the character Hooks, we see that it is possible for one to find redemption through noble deeds, even after a life of crime that has spanned many years. The character Slipher is also offered a chance at redemption after deserting his serpan regiment and being targeted for execution, though his fate is somewhat different from Hooks, presumably due to his inability or lack of will to redeem himself when offered the opportunity.
Distrust of power: Throughout the bulk of the novel, the acting ruler of Harwelden is the Grayfarer Waldemariam, who sits at the head of the powerful Grayfarer Council of Harwelden. Early in the story, the reader is led to question his motives, and Waldemariam repeatedly and knowingly lies to Harwelden's citizenry about the threat they are facing from the encroaching serpans. Several members of his own council grow wary of him, even to the point of suspecting treason, but the citizens of Harwelden, believing his every word, fail to show any concern at all as the serpan army grows nearer. In many scenes, we see the citizens of Harwelden rejoicing, holding parades as they prepare for an upcoming seasonal festival, even as the enemy army is surrounding their mountaintop home.
Can there be goodness in evil?: Though the serpan culture is depicted as remorselessly violent, we learn that Slipher's mother is gentle, and has gone to great sacrifice for Slipher and his deformed younger brother. We also see Slipher's gentleness toward and love of his pet donkey, Pongo.

Author
Robert Louis Smith is a 42-year interventional cardiologist affiliated with the Oklahoma Heart Institute in Tulsa, Oklahoma.  He specializes in transcatheter stent therapies including placement of coronary stents in heart arteries to treat conditions like heart attacks and unstable angina. He also specializes in the invasive treatment of peripheral arterial disease and lower extremity venous disease.  He obtained Bachelor of Arts and Bachelor of Science degrees in Psychology and Microbiology (respectively) from the University of Oklahoma in Norman, Oklahoma.  He went on to obtain a Master of Science degree in Anaerobic Microbiology and then a Medical Doctorate (M.D.) from the University of Oklahoma, graduating in 2000. Internship and Residency in Internal Medicine were completed at Emory University in Atlanta in 2003. Cardiology training was begun at Tulane University in New Orleans, where he lived from 2003 to 2005, and completed at Vanderbilt University in Nashville in 2006.  He went on to perform additional training in interventional cardiology at the University of Florida in Jacksonville, graduating in 2007. He is married and the father of two young children. He began writing Antiquitas Lost in 2003 while in training at the Tulane University School of Medicine. During Hurricane Katrina, he was the chief fellow for the Tulane cardiology training program and weathered the storm at the New Orleans VA Medical center in downtown New Orleans, directly across the street from the Louisiana Superdome. Though he later safely left the city, the manuscript for Antiquitas Lost was feared lost for several months.

Marketing
Antiquitas Lost had its world premiere at the 2011 New York Comic Convention (at the Javits convention center near Times Square) in October 2011. Over 100,000 guests attended the New York event. According to the Antiquitas Lost Facebook page, advertising at the 2011 New York Comic Con helped to generate hits from 76 different countries on the official Antiquitas Lost website. Print publicity for the initial release was handled by the Carol Fass publicity agency out of New York, and digital/social publicity representation was by FSB Associates out of New Jersey.  The novels website (www.AntiquitasLost.com) was also designed by FSB Associates. Following the appearance at the New York Convention, the author (Robert Louis Smith) and illustrator (Geof Isherwood) appeared at the 2011 Halifax, Nova Scotia Hal-Con convention

Adrien Morot Connection:
For the 2011 New York convention, Medlock Publishing worked with Oscar nominated Hollywood special effects artist Adrien Morot to design and build a costume for Antiquitas Lost antagonist, Malus Lothar. Morot initially rose to fame through his special effects work on films like 300, Night at the Museum, and The Day After Tomorrow. In 2010, he was nominated for an Oscar for his work with Paul Giamatti in Barney's Version. The costume he designed was worn during the New York convention by actor Scott Mason, who appeared in a small role in 2011's Oscar nominated True Grit and most recently performed in a larger role for the upcoming Nick Cassavetes film Yellow.

New Orleans connection

The author began writing the book in 2003 while living in New Orleans's Garden District, and New Orleans is prominently featured in the book. Chapter one takes place in New Orleans Garden District, and several real-life locales are mentioned. These include Pleasant Street (location of the authors first New Orleans apartment), the old Lafayette Cemetery (understood to be Lafayette Cemetery number 1 in New Orleans Garden District), and an "old book store," understood to be the Garden District Book Shop on Prytania Street.  There are also references to St. Charles street, the Mississippi River, and the notorious pirate Jean Lafitte, after whom a famous Bourbon Street bar is named.  An important Gimlet city is named after a street in the garden district (Prytania), and the ocean on the east coast of the Carafayan continent, The Ponchatoulan Ocean, seems to have been influenced by the Louisiana town of Ponchatoula. Toward the end of the book, Hurricane Katrina is referenced.

Anne Rice connection
The author has stated that he began writing Antiquitas Lost while sitting at Anne Rice's dining room table. Although the author and Ms. Rice were neighbors from 2003 to 2005, they have never met. The author bought Ms. Rice's dining room table from an estate sale at one of her New Orlean's properties, the old St. Elizabeth's orphanage.  He has stated that he hoped working at the dining room table would bring him luck, and that he imagined that Ms. Rice may have sat at the same table while working on one of her Vampire Chronicles books.

Publisher
Antiquitas Lost is offered by Medlock Publishing, LLC, based out of Tulsa, Oklahoma.

References

External links 
The Antiquitas Lost Official Website
Antiquitas Lost on Facebook
Antiquitas Lost on Twitter
The Official Geof Isherwood Website
Geof Isherwood on Facebook
Geof Isherwood at the Grand Comics Database
Geof Isherwood at the Comic Books Database
Geof Isherwood at Lambiek's Comiclopedia
Michael Carr at Editing Writing Network
The FSB Associates Official Website
FSB Associates on Facebook

2011 American novels
Young adult fantasy novels
American young adult novels
American fantasy novels
2011 fantasy novels
Contemporary fantasy novels
High fantasy novels
Self-published books
2011 debut novels